Onychostoma barbatulum (common name: Taiwan shovel-jaw carp) is a species of ray-finned fish in the family Cyprinidae. It can grow to  SL, but commonly only to about half of that.

Onychostoma barbatulum is found in Taiwan and in the Pearl River Basin of southern China. It is a herbivorous species that occurs in fast-flowing sections of rivers. Its populations may be dramatically impacted by typhoon-related disturbance, in one documented case nearly extirpating a local population.

References

barbatulum
Cyprinid fish of Asia
Freshwater fish of China
Freshwater fish of Taiwan
Fish described in 1908
Taxa named by Jacques Pellegrin